is a 2016 Japanese sports romantic teen drama film written and directed by  and starring Suzu Hirose, Shūhei Nomura, Mackenyu, Mone Kamishiraishi, Miyuki Matsuda and Jun Kunimura. It is the second of three live action film adaptations of the manga series Chihayafuru, written and illustrated by Yuki Suetsugu. The film was released in Japan by Toho on April 29, 2016. Chihayafuru: Musubi, the third and final film in the series, was released in Japan on March 17, 2018.

Plot

Cast
Suzu Hirose as Chihaya Ayase
Shūhei Nomura as Taichi Mashima
Mackenyu as Arata Wataya
Mone Kamishiraishi as Kanade Ōe
 as Yūsei Nishida
 as Tsutomu Komano
 as Akihito Sudō
Mayu Matsuoka as Shinobu Wakamiya
Miyuki Matsuda as Taeko Miyauchi
Jun Kunimura as Harada Hideo
 as Hiro Kinashi
Alice Hirose as Chitose Ayase, Chihaya's sister
Masane Tsukayama as Hajime Wataya
 Riku Hagiwara

Production
The film was shot at the Omi Shrine in Shiga Prefecture. The theme song of the two films is "FLASH" by the Japanese group Perfume. The original soundtracks are composed by Masaru Yokoyama.

Release
The release date of the film was announced in December 2015 for April 29, 2016.

Sequel
A sequel was announced at Chihayafuru: Shimo no Ku's premiere. This third and final film, titled Chihayafuru: Musubi, was released on March 17, 2018. Koizumi returned as director and the main cast reprised their roles. The conclusion of the story, set two years after the events of the first two films, features four new cast members, including Kaya Kiyohara who portrays Io Wagatsuma, a character written exclusively for the film. Kento Kaku appears as Hisashi Suō, Hayato Sano as Akihiro Tsukuba and Mio Yūki as Sumire Hanano.

References

External links
 

2010s teen drama films
2010s Japanese films
Nippon TV films
Films directed by Norihiro Koizumi
Films set in Tokyo
Live-action films based on manga
Japanese high school films
Japanese teen drama films
Toho films
2018 drama films
2010s high school films